Brazen Heart is a studio album by American trumpeter Dave Douglas which was released in October 2015 on Douglas' own Greenleaf Music label. The album bears a dedication to Douglas’s older brother, Damon, who died in June 2015 after a long fight with cancer.

Reception
Cormac Larkin of Irish Times stated "Ever the innovator, trumpeter Dave Douglas’s latest release, through his own Greenleaf label, is another brave attempt to change the way we consume music... Nothing beats the live experience, especially when it comes to improvisation, but these releases of entire live sets come a close second".

Mark Milano of The Absolute Sound wrote "Douglas’ style here is restless and engaged in the moment in a way that reveals his time spent in less explicitly jazz-rooted free improvisation, favoring long lines with a soft attack and rarely lingering on a single note, while the writing and interplay provide a 1960s modern jazz backdrop and enough information to reward many listens. Jon Irabagon offers the other main voice on tenor, always melodic and at times fragile in a way that blends well into a group sound that is consistently more than the sum of its parts. The sound quality is high, providing a good example of how acoustic music can be recorded in a close-up manner without sacrificing the ambience of the room".

Track listing

Personnel
Quintet
Dave Douglas – trumpet, liner notes, producer
Jon Irabagon – sax (tenor)
Matt Mitchell – piano
Linda Oh – bass
Rudy Royston – drums

Production
Margaret Derose – cover photo
Viktor E. Frankl – quotation author
Christoph Green – photography
Tyler McDiarmid – mastering, mixing
Aaron Nevezie – engineer
Neal Shaw – assistant
Eve Trojanov – back cover photo
Jim Tuerk – package design

References

2015 albums
Dave Douglas (trumpeter) albums
Greenleaf Music albums